Caryville may refer to some places in the United States:

 Caryville, Florida
 Caryville, Massachusetts 
 Caryville, Tennessee
 Caryville, Wisconsin